Shivajinagar railway station (earlier Bhamburde railway station) is a train station serving Shivajinagar (earlier Bhamburde) suburb of Pune. It has two platforms. This is a halt for suburban trains of Pune. This station is important because this is the nearest railway station to Pune's Session Court and many important building like the College of Engineering, PMC building etc. Trains which halt on this station generally halt for 2 to 3 minutes. The National Highway 48 runs behind the station.

Trains

Express/Mails

Ordinary

Train to Navi Mumbai
A train service is proposed from this station to Kurla's Lokmanya Tilak Terminus via Navi Mumbai. This train will halt at Lonavala, Karjat, Panvel, Vashi and Belapur stations. The current link from Navi Mumbai is Pragati Express which is run on trial basis between the two cities.

Suburban trains
There are two trains which originate from Shivajinagar for Lonavala and two trains from Lonavala that terminate at Shivajinagar. There are 15 trains which operate between Pune Junction–Lonavala–Pune Junction section and three between Pune Junction–Talegaon Dabhade–Pune Junction section. These trains have their halt at this station.

Expansion
A new platform is proposed to be constructed at the station for trains originating and terminating here. This will accommodate the local trains originating and terminating over here. This platform will be constructed near platform no. 1. There are also plans to start long-distance trains from here. Plans are there to construct three multistory buildings dedicated parking lots for vehicles, waiting rooms and commercial outlets at this station. One track will be increased for termination of long-distance trains. Land acquisition will be done on Patil Estate side.

The existing station will be demolished and new station will be constructed on the site of current station. Roughly 8.5 acres land will be required in addition. The new station will have connectivity to Pune Metro project, National Highway 48 and to neighboring bus stand.

See also
 
 Pune Station Bus Stand
 Swargate bus station
 Shivajinagar, Pune
 Shivajinagar Bus Stand

References

External links
Shivajinagar bus stand timetable
Shivajinagar, Pune
Shivajinagar Railway Station

Pune Suburban Railway
Railway stations in Pune
Monuments and memorials to Shivaji
Year of establishment missing
Pune railway division